2 Dope Queens is a podcast hosted by Jessica Williams and Phoebe Robinson that aired between April 4, 2016, and November 14, 2018. 

For the first seven days following the podcast's launch, it was number one on the iTunes podcast charts. It is produced by WNYC Studios. The podcast features female comedians, comedians of color, and LGBT comedians, in an effort to represent people from different backgrounds. The podcast's guests include Jon Hamm, Nick Kroll, LeVar Burton, Naomi Ekperigin, Nore Davis, Aparna Nancherla, Marc Maron, and Michelle Buteau.  2 Dope Queens is WNYC Studios' first comedy podcast.

On June 27, 2016, Sooo Many White Guys, the first 2 Dope Queens spin-off, debuted. The podcast is hosted by Phoebe Robinson and produced by Ilana Glazer.

A four-episode HBO special based on the show aired in February and March 2018 directed by podcast guest Tig Notaro. A second four-episode season aired in 2019.

Format 
2 Dope Queens is taped live at Union Hall in Brooklyn.  Though the live show runs about two hours, the podcast is edited down to about an hour.

Each episode features three guest comedians. Issues discussed on the podcast include "race, gender, sex, and other topics".

Host Jessica Williams said of the podcast, "For our show, people get to be the stars of their own stories and they get to be the stars of their own stand up, so it's really cool to give our friends and a lot of people of color and different orientations an opportunity to speak for themselves and be sort of the main character as opposed to like the side character or supporting character."

History 
2 Dope Queens stemmed from Blaria LIVE!, a monthly stand-up show in Brooklyn, hosted by Phoebe Robinson and Jessica Williams. Blaria LIVE! was inspired by the blog of the same name authored by Phoebe Robinson. Similarly to 2 Dope Queens, Blaria LIVE! featured diverse comedians from all over the United States.

The 2 Dope Queens podcast debuted on April 4, 2016. In its first week, it was number one on the iTunes podcast charts and stayed there for a full week.

On July 19, 2016, Sooo Many White Guys, the first 2 Dope Queens spin-off debuted. Sooo Many White Guys is an interview-talk show hosted by Phoebe Robinson and produced by Ilana Glazer with guests including Nia Long, Janet Mock, Hari Kondabolu, Gina Rodriguez, Roxane Gay, and Hasan Minhaj.

The podcast inspired two round of HBO specials, also titled ''2 Dope Queens.

After taking a break from the podcast to film for HBO, a final episode was published where the two hosts interviewed Michelle Obama and announced the ending of the show.

Awards

Episodes

Season 1 (2018)

Season 2 (2019)

References

External links 
 

2016 establishments in New York City
WNYC Studios programs
2016 podcast debuts
Works by Tig Notaro
Podcasts adapted into television shows
2018 podcast endings